Morolimumab is a human monoclonal antibody against the human Rhesus factor.

References

Monoclonal antibodies